Kotal-e Hindukush is a mountain pass in Parwan Province, Afghanistan. It is 205 m lower than the mountain Band e Hindukush.

References

Mountain passes of Afghanistan
Landforms of Parwan Province